Lone Star Funds, legal name of main entity Lone Star Global Acquisitions, Ltd. is an American private equity firm that invests in distressed assets in the U.S., Canada and internationally. The founder of Lone Star established its first fund in 1995 (under a different name) and Lone Star has to date organized 21 private equity funds with total capital commitments since inception of over $86 billion (as of 2022). Lone Star's investors include corporate and public pension funds, sovereign wealth funds, university endowments, foundations, fund of funds and high-net-worth individuals. Lone Star Funds has affiliate offices in North America, Europe and Japan.

Hudson Advisors LP, an approximately 900-person global asset management company owned and controlled by the founder of Lone Star, performs due diligence and analysis, asset management and related services for Lone Star Funds. In this capacity, Hudson Advisors LP has managed in excess of $224 billion of assets for Lone Star Funds since inception.

History
Lone Star was founded by John Grayken. From 1993 to 1995, Mr. Grayken was chairman and CEO of Brazos Partners L.P., a joint venture between the Robert M. Bass Group and the Federal Deposit Insurance Corporation, that resolved approximately 1,300 “bad bank” assets resulting from the U.S. savings and loan crisis in the early ‘90s. During this period, Brazos Advisors LLC was formed to provide asset-management and related services to Brazos Partners.

Following Brazos Partners, Grayken organized institutional capital to continue investing in distressed assets, closing Brazos Fund, L.P. in 1995 with approximately $250 million of capital commitments.

Lone Star Opportunity Fund, L.P. followed in 1996, with approximately $396 million of capital commitments. At that time Brazos Advisors, LLC was renamed Hudson Advisors LLC.

After an expansion into Canada in 1995 and 1996, Grayken pursued the launch of a global platform for Lone Star in 1997. Since then, Lone Star has invested extensively in North America, Europe and East Asia. Lone Star invested primarily in East Asia, including Japan, Korea, Indonesia and Taiwan, following the Asian financial crisis in the late 1990s. In the mid-2000s, following the establishment of the Eurozone, Lone Star increased its investment focus in Europe. And with the onset of the global financial crisis, from 2007 Lone Star was again actively investing in the U.S.

Through its credit affiliate, LStar Capital (officially LSC Film Corporation), the company entered the motion picture financing sector when they signed a $200 million deal with Sony Pictures in early 2014. The deal gives them a financial stake in nearly all of Sony's upcoming films. However, due to the poor box-office performance of Sony's movies, the two firms severed ties on July 17, 2017, two years before the deal was set to end.

In July 2015, Lone Star acquired the UK property investment and development company Quintain for £700 million.

In March 2017, the Portuguese Central Bank announced that Lone Star Funds will acquire 75% of third largest Portuguese bank, Novo Banco, in return for a capital injection of €1bn. The other 25% will be retained by the Portuguese bank's resolution fund. In October 2017 the deal was closed and Lone Star Funds started controlling 75% of Novo Banco.

Investment approach
Lone Star invests in a variety of asset classes, primarily distressed opportunities in developed markets.

Funds
The following list shows the company's various funds.

References

External links
 Official website

Private equity firms of the United States
Companies based in Dallas
Financial services companies established in 1995